Nookap Island is a small, irregularly shaped island located in Jones Sound, southeast of Skruis Point, Devon Island, in the territory of Nunavut. It is a member of the Queen Elizabeth Islands and the Arctic Archipelago. Nookap Island is named after Nookapingwa, Inuk guide father of Arnakitsoq Simigaq.

References

External links
 Nookap Island in the Atlas of Canada - Toporama; Natural Resources Canada

Islands of the Queen Elizabeth Islands
Uninhabited islands of Qikiqtaaluk Region
Islands of Baffin Bay